Andrea Blackwell (born 23 November 1962) is a Canadian basketball player. She competed in the women's tournament at the 1984 Summer Olympics and the 1996 Summer Olympics. At the university level, she played for the Bishop's Gaiters women's basketball program.

Awards and honors
Top 100 U Sports women's basketball Players of the Century (1920-2020).
 Bishop's Gaiters Wall of Distinction: Inducted in 1998

References

External links
 

1962 births
Living people
Basketball people from Alberta
Basketball players at the 1984 Summer Olympics
Basketball players at the 1996 Summer Olympics
Canadian women's basketball players
Olympic basketball players of Canada
Sportspeople from Calgary